Expo-daero() is the road connecting Dolsan Intersection in Dolsan-eup, Yeosu, South Jeolla and Seongsangyo in Haeryong-myeon, Suncheon, South Jeolla. The all section is part of National Route 17, and from Deogyang Intersection to end of road is part of Local Route 22. This road was opened to traffic on 12 April 2012 for Expo 2012.

History 
20 January 2012: opened to temporary traffic (17.36 km; Sora-myeon, Yeosu – Haeryong-myeon, Suncheon)
12 April 2012: opened to traffic (38.8 km)

List of Facilities 
 (■): Motorway (자동차전용도로; Jadongcha Jeonyong Doro)
 IC: Interchange (나들목; Nadeulmok)
 IS: Intersection (교차로; Gyocharo)
 3-IS: 3-way Intersection (삼거리; Samgeori)
 4-IS: 4-way Intersection (사거리; Sageori)
 BR: Big Bridge (대교; Daegyo)
 br: bridge (교; Gyo)
 TN: tunnel (터널; Teoneol)

References

Roads in South Jeolla
Yeosu
Suncheon